Governor Franklin may refer to:

Benjamin Franklin (1706–1790), 6th President of Pennsylvania
Benjamin Joseph Franklin (1839–1898), 12th Governor of Arizona Territory
Jesse Franklin (1760–1823), 20th Governor of North Carolina
John Franklin (1786–1847), Lieutenant-Governor of Van Diemen's Land from 1837 to 1843
Michael Francklin (1733–1782), Lieutenant Governor of Nova Scotia from 1766 to 1772
William Franklin (1731–1813), 13th Colonial Governor of New Jersey from 1763 to 1776